Aristeidae is a family of Dendrobranchiata decapod crustaceans known as deep-sea shrimps, gamba prawns or gamba shrimps. Some species are subject to commercial fisheries.

Genera
The following genera are classified under the Aristeidae:

Aristaeomorpha Wood-Mason, 1891
Aristaeopsis Wood-Mason, 1891
Aristeus Duvernoy, 1840
Austropenaeus Pérez Farfante & Kensley, 1997
Cerataspis Gray, 1828
Hemipenaeus Spence Bate, 1881
Hepomadus Spence Bate, 1881
Parahepomadus Crosnier, 1978
Pseudaristeus Crosnier, 1978

References

Dendrobranchiata
Decapod families